Alex McGough (born November 19, 1995) is an American football quarterback for the Birmingham Stallions of the United States Football League (USFL). He played college football at FIU, and was selected by Seattle Seahawks in the seventh round of the 2018 NFL Draft.

College career

2014 season 
On August 30, 2014, McGough made his FIU debut, recording 117 yards and a touchdown against Bethune–Cookman. On September 27, he threw an 85-yard and a 75-yard touchdown against UAB. On November 15, he recorded a season-high 231 yards and three touchdowns against Middle Tennessee. He finished his rookie season recording 1,680 yards and 14 touchdowns.

2015 season 
On October 17, 2015, McGough attempted a career-high 51 passes against Middle Tennessee, second most in school history. On October 24, McGough recorded a career-best 390 yards (2nd in school history) versus Old Dominion. He completed 31 of 39 passes, good for 2nd most completions and 4th highest percentage in school history. On November 7, McGough recorded 284 yards and three touchdowns in a 48–31 blowout against Charlotte. He finished his second season completing 269 of 420 passes for 2,722 yards and 21 touchdowns, all school records (he broke his record for passing yards in 2017).

2016 season 
On October 2, 2016, McGough ran for a career-high two touchdowns against Florida Atlantic. The next week, he threw a season-high 3 touchdowns against UTEP. On October 15, McGough threw for a season-high 315 yards and scored three touchdowns, including the game-winner against Charlotte. He missed the final three games of the season due to a wrist injury.

2017 season 
On August 31, 2017, McGough threw a 75-yard touchdown pass in the season opener against UCF. The next week, he threw for a season-high 328 yards and runs in a game-winning touchdown against Alcorn State. On September 30, McGough led the Panthers to a 19-point comeback win over Charlotte, outscoring the 49ers 16–3 in the second half to a 30–29 win. On December 2, he threw a season-high three touchdowns and ran for a career-high 108 yards against UMass. He became the third quarterback in FIU history to run over 100 yards in a game. He ended his senior season with a completion percentage of 65.3% and a passer rating of 142.8, both school records (previous records were 64% in 2015 by himself & 141.5 rating by Jamie Burke in 2002).

The Panthers finished with an 8–4 record, qualifying for a bowl game for the first time since 2011. On December 22, 2017, McGough left in the first quarter of the 2017 Gasparilla Bowl against Temple with a fractured collarbone. The Panthers would go on to lose 28–3.

Professional career

Seattle Seahawks
McGough was drafted by the Seattle Seahawks in the seventh round, 220th overall, of the 2018 NFL Draft. He was the first quarterback drafted by the Seahawks since Russell Wilson in 2012. On May 15, 2018, he signed his rookie contract. He was waived on September 1, 2018 and was re-signed to the practice squad.

Jacksonville Jaguars
On January 15, 2019, McGough signed a reserve/future contract with the Jacksonville Jaguars. He was waived on August 31, 2019.

Houston Texans
On September 1, 2019, McGough was signed to the Houston Texans practice squad. He was promoted to the active roster on September 10, 2019. He was waived on October 16, 2019 and re-signed to the practice squad. He signed a reserve/future contract with the Texans on January 13, 2020.

McGough was waived on August 31, 2020. He was re-signed to the practice squad on September 14, 2020. He was released on October 12.

Seattle Seahawks (second stint)
On December 9, 2020, McGough was signed to the Seattle Seahawks' practice squad. On January 11, 2021, McGough signed a reserve/futures contract with the Seahawks. McGough was waived on August 23, 2021.

Birmingham Stallions
McGough was selected with the sixth pick of the first round of the 2022 USFL Draft by the Birmingham Stallions. He suffered an ankle injury, and was transferred to the inactive roster on April 22, 2022. He was moved back to the active roster on May 6. During the Championship game, McGough replaced an injured J'Mar Smith, throwing for 7 completions on 10 attempts for 77 yards, and a touchdown, helping the Stallions earn their first USFL championship.

Career Statistics

Personal life 
McGough's uncle, Kelly Goodburn, was an NFL punter for the Kansas City Chiefs and the Washington Redskins. His younger brother Shane is an offensive lineman for FIU.

References

External links 
Florida International University Bio
Seattle Seahawks Bio

1995 births
Living people
American football quarterbacks
FIU Panthers football players
Houston Texans players
Jacksonville Jaguars players
Players of American football from Tampa, Florida
Seattle Seahawks players
Birmingham Stallions (2022) players